Heliciopsis lanceolata is a species of plant in the family Proteaceae. It is found in Indonesia and Malaysia. It is threatened by habitat loss.

References

lanceolata
Endangered plants
Taxonomy articles created by Polbot